Jad Azkoul (Arabic: جأد عزقول) is a teacher and concert classical guitarist who was once the student of Abel Carlevaro, and translated much of his work.

In 1997, Carlevaro declared that Azkoul was his "genuine representative", as well as being a "great master teaching alongside" him.

Azkoul is renowned both as a performer and teacher; he is often invited to give masterclasses in various festivals throughout the world.

Critical acclaim 
Jad Azkoul was awarded the Order of the Cedar, making him a Knight of Lebanon, for his musical contributions to the country.

Joseph McLellan of the Washington Post had this to say on the subject of Jad Azkoul's guitar-playing:

“Azkoul can make his instrument sing. This is a skill far more important than the ability to whip out thousands of notes per minute accurately and expressively, which he can also do.”

On another occasion, McLellan was quoted as saying:

"The guitar can be many different kinds of instrument, and Azkoul is a master of all its potentials: the raw power of the amplified guitar used in rock (which is how Azkoul began as a boy in his native Lebanon), the delicacies of music composed for the lute, the fire and energy of Flamenco, the rhythmic complexities of Latin American dances and the experimental techniques of modern composers."

Career 
Jad Azkoul has been teaching at the Conservatoire Populaire de Musique, Danse et Théàtre (CPMDT) in Geneva since 1984.

Two notable absences were when he lived and taught in Washington DC from 1991 to 1996, and when he was in London on sabbatical leave (2010-2011). Since 2010 he has also been on the music faculty at the London College of Music. He gives regular summer master classes in France at "Musicalta" in Alsace and at the "Musicales de Grillon" in Provence.

References 

Classical guitarists
Music educators
Living people
Knights of the National Order of the Cedar
Year of birth missing (living people)